Borchaly sultanate (also known as Borchaly khanate) — was a feudal state that existed until the middle of the XVIII century on the territory of the historical region of Borchaly (modern day Georgia and the Lori region of Armenia).

History
According to "Georgian Soviet Encyclopedia", at the beginning of the XVII century, during the rule of Shah Abbas I, the Turkic tribe Borchalu migrated to Debed Valley, which gave its name to the region Borchaly. In 1604 the Borchaly khanate (sultanate) was established here. In the 1750s, Tsar Kartli Teymuraz II took over the Sultanate of Borchaly, and in 1765 the tsar of Kartli-Kakheti Irakli II transformed the sultanate into a prefecture. By the beginning of the 19th century, the sultanate was completely dissolved and became part of the Russian Empire.

Rulers
 Musa Kuli-khan, son of Kelbi Huseyn-khan (1752–1755)

See also 
Kazakh sultanate
Shamshadil sultanate
Shoragel sultanate
Khanates of the Caucasus
South Caucasus
Western Azerbaijan
Azerbaijan Democratic Republic

References

18th century in Azerbaijan
Former countries in Western Asia